Bruce Hyde may refer to:

 Bruce Hyde (ontologist) (1941–2015), American actor and educator
 Bruce Hyde (musician) (born 1986), American musician and athlete